The Battle of Grand Harbour also known as Operazione MALTA-1 was a battle that took place during the siege of Malta on the night of 25-26 July 1941 in World War II. Malta's Grand Harbour, which was defended by the British was attacked by the Italian Decima Flottiglia MAS (part of the Italian Regia Marina) using MAS motorboats, MT explosive motorboats and SLC Maiale human torpedoes. The Italians were detected early on by British radar, and soon after coastal artillery from Fort Saint Elmo opened fire when the Italians approached at close range. The Italians managed to destroy the bridge covering the entrance to the harbour which blocked their passage, and the Italian force was subsequently wiped out with the aid of the RAF.

Background

During the siege of Malta and subsequent Mediterranean campaign, Valletta, with its considerable Royal Navy presence, had long been a thorn in the Axis' side. In 1941 a Royal Navy convoy codenamed Operation Substance had managed to relieve the island having repelled Italian air and naval attacks. With the Italian Air Force's frustration to cripple the Royal Navy, they resorted to the Regia Marina. After the success of the Italian Royal Navy explosive boats on the Raid on Souda Bay off Crete in March 1941 the Italians decided to launch a surprise attack on Grand Harbour with the same method. A mission was set up by them for the Decima Flottiglia MAS, a new elite commando frogmen unit known only as 'La Decima' to plan the attack. One of the developers of the unit Teseo Tesei would take part in the attack.

Plan of attack
The unit was led by Captain Vittorio Moccagatta who made sure the operation was well-prepared with several reconnaissance sorties having been carried out by aircraft. A supporting diversionary air attack was also planned at the time of the attack.
Italians
 To tow and carry the unit the Aviso Diana, a converted and armed private yacht of the Italian Duce Benito Mussolini.
 two torpedo boats of the Motoscafo Armato Silurante (MAS): (MAS-451 and MAS-452)
 nine MT explosive motorboats: Motoscafo Turismo (MT) 
 two manned torpedoes Maiale: Siluro a Lenta Corsa (SLC)
 two support boats: Motoscafo Turismo Lento (MTL) and Motoscafo Turismo Silurante (MTS)

The plan was to place one of the Human Torpedoes in front of the nets around Fort St. Elmo's bridge that the British deployed to close the harbour. After its destruction the ten fast boats would then rush in and the commandos would then land and attach limpet mines to the sides of as many of the Royal Navy's fleet at anchor as they could before heading out. The second Human Torpedo was tasked with finding and destroying at least one of the Royal Navy submarines in Marsamxett Harbour on Manoel Island.

British
The Royal Malta Artillery defended Grand Harbour; this consisted of nine gun emplacements of the 3rd Coastal Battery stationed on Fort St Elmo under the command of Colonel Henry Ferro. The guns were twin 6-pounder guns with a range of about 5,500 yards. The 3rd battery on Fort St Elmo also had heavy coastal artillery in 9.2 and 6 inch calibers but not were able to fire at small close-range targets. There were also several machine gun positions around the harbour on the opposite Fort Ricasoli, as well as a number of searchlights that could be used to locate targets both on the ground and in the air.

Battle
On July 25th, 1941, the force consisting of 33 commandos, ten surface ships and two human torpedoes departed from Augusta, Sicily onboard and towed by the Aviso Diana.

The entire group had already been delayed on the crossing from Sicily and technical problems with one of the MT boats and one of the SLC torpedoes delayed the attack further. The diversionary supporting raid by the Regia Aeronautica had taken place but were unaware of the delay by the seabourne force. By the time the all clear had been given on Malta the seabourne unit was still too far away from their target.

Seabourne assault
The Italians eventually offloaded from the Aviso Diana and headed towards Grand Harbour. Unbeknownst to them the British, firstly through Ultra intelligence and then from acoustic mirrors at Maghtab managed to detect the ships from as far out as fourteen miles, giving the defenders plenty of time to organise their defences. Radar also identified a target but this had disappeared when the Aviso Diana had sailed off. Major Henry Ferro, in command of the RMA at Fort St Elmo ordered his men to the alert but determined not to alert the Italians. As they approached the harbour the first Human torpedo's warhead malfunctioned and didn't detonate and destroy the nets as planned. They withdrew under a smoke screen as a precautionary measure.

It wasn't until around after 4am that the Italians tried to assault the Harbour proper. An alert machine gun crew from the Cheshire Regiment spotted the boats just as the morning light was breaking. As the boats approached, the searchlights were switched on, immediately illuminating the sea approaches to Grand Harbour. On sighting the boats the shores batteries opened up as the Italian boats then raced for the entrance. The boats however all began taking damage from small arms and gun fire.

A second craft directed at the bridge failed to explode but the third hit the central pylon, blew up and set off the unexploded boat. However, the objective of blowing a hole in the protective steel net was not achieved because the explosion bought down the viaduct's span next to the breakwater. It fell between the pylon, blocked the access to the harbour and created a further defensive line - the Italians were now not able to get into the Harbour at all.

The British then picked out the speeding assault craft - the twin quick firing six-pounders at Fort St Elmo and Fort Ricasoli managed to make their mark with their accurate firing, either destroying the boats or forcing their crews to abandon them. The Torpedo-boat 452 took a single direct hit and was destroyed, killing all the occupants - the rest now attempted to retreat. The seabourne attack had lasted a total of just six minutes.

Air attack
Meanwhile four Hawker Hurricanes from 229 Squadron were scrambled from RAF Hal Far to pounce on the Italians. One had to return due to faulty landing gear but the remaining three found and attacked the retreating boats five miles east of the Island. Within fifteen minutes all five boats became burning wrecks with no signs of life on board. Attempts by Italian Macchi M.C.200's to give the MAS boats assistance proved futile - three of them were shot down by the Hurricanes, one pilot bailed out and was captured by an armed trawler close by. The Hurricanes landed at 0605 hrs with no damage. One of the Italian boats, the MAS 452 was found adrift in open seas by the British and towed to port by a seaplane. A human torpedo was also recovered by the British, becoming the first example they had been able to examine.

Aftermath

The attack was as a complete failure - neither of the objectives in the two ports of Malta were achieved. A total of seventeen Italians were killed, including the entire leadership of the Decima MAS, whilst eighteen were captured - one of which would die a few days later due to the injuries sustained. In addition to the nine MT boats, two SLCs, their mother boat, two torpedo boats and two MC.200 fighters were also lost. Not a single one of the nineteen Decima MAS members involved in the attack returned to Italy - ten had been killed. The rest, nine in all were taken prisoners of war and were detained at Corradino Military Prison until the following Fall of the Fascist regime in Italy on August 2. The loss of the entire officers including the developer of the SLC, weakened the unit and delayed further operations. Moccagatta who was aboard MAS 452, was killed when the MAS was strafed by a Hurricane, both he and Teseo Tesei were nevertheless posthumously awarded the Italian Gold Medal of Military Valour. The manned torpedoes nevertheless did take part in the successful attack on the port of Alexandria on the night of December 18 later in the year, in which the battleships HMS Queen Elizabeth and HMS Valiant were badly damaged.

The British suffered no losses, the only damage sustained was the loss of the bridge spanning the Harbour entrance. The collapsed span was removed by the British after the attack, and the rest of the bridge was subsequently demolished after the war. All that remained were the stone abutments on either side and parts of the central columns. The breakwater and lighthouse were subsequently only accessible by boat. A full report by Lt E.D. Woolley, the Mine Disposal Officer on the recovery and dismantling of the surviving craft was produced. The captured MAS 452 which had been recovered by the British, was put into service as a tender and renamed XMAS. 

The bridge covering the harbour was never rebuilt post war, but a new one was inaugurated on 24 July 2012 by Austin Gatt, the Minister for Infrastructure, Transport and Communications, and it was subsequently opened to the public.

References

Bibliography
 
 
 
 

Grand Harbour, battle of
Conflicts in 1941
Siege of Malta
Battle of Grand Harbour
World War II campaigns of the Mediterranean Theatre
Naval aviation operations and battles
Battle of Grand Harbour
Battle of Grand Harbour
Battle of Grand Harbour
Military history of the British Empire and Commonwealth in World War II